David-Imad Ramadan (born May 31, 1970) is a Lebanese-born American politician and businessman. He is a former Republican member of the Virginia House of Delegates, representing the 87th district in Loudoun and Prince William counties from 2012 to 2016. He opted not to seek re-election in 2015, and was succeeded by his 2013 opponent, Democrat John J. Bell.

Early life and education
Ramadan grew up in Lebanon and completed his high school studies at International College, Beirut. He emigrated to the United States in 1989 and has resided in Virginia since then. He is a graduate of George Mason University, earning a Bachelor of Arts degree in government and politics and a Master of Arts degree in international trade and transactions. He completed graduate studies at Oxford University, the American Graduate School of Business (Geneva, Switzerland), Johns Hopkins University, and Georgetown University.

Career 
Prior to entering politics, Ramadan worked at Curves International and in the government relations sector.

Ramadan is also a frequent commentator on TV and radio news networks such as ABC's Good Morning America, LBC, MSNBC, France 24, Al-Hurra, BBC, CNN, and NPR.

Ramadan served on the Board of Visitors of George Mason University, where he was appointed by Governor Bob McDonnell on July 1, 2010. The Washington Post on July 1, 2010, described the appointment by Governor McDonnell "as a thank you to longtime supporters and friends".  He is also an adjunct professor at George Mason University, teaching "Global Affairs - Middle East Realities" and "Virginia Government and Politics" courses.

Ramadan is a political activist with active roles in the Republican Party of Virginia, the Loudoun County Republican Committee, and the Arab-American Republican community. He has served on presidential political campaigns as well as on gubernatorial and senatorial campaigns, and was appointed by RPV Chair in 2008 to ethnic outreach leadership.

In November 2018, when Republican Congresswoman Barbara Comstock was ousted by Democratic nominee Jennifer Wexton, Ramadan told The Washington Post that her loss is to be blamed on factors at the national level, not the district level. He has been outspoken about his belief that the Virginia Republican party needs to pay more attention to the needs and opinions of Northern Virginia (known colloquially as "NoVa"), and not just to rural voters in the rest of the Commonwealth.

Legislative history
Ramadan served on the several committees in the Virginia House of Delegates, specifically Privileges & Elections (P&E), Science & Technology (S&T), and the General Laws Committee. He served as the chairman of the P&E Constitutional Amendments Subcommittee.

Ramadan was the co-founder and co-chairman of the "Business Development Caucus," and the co-founded and co-chairman of the "Redskins Pride Caucus".

Ramadan authored several pieces of legislation which became law during his four years in the Virginia House:

· Constitutional Amendment in support of military families  
· Online Voter Registration 
· High School to Work Partnerships 
· Diwali Day 
· Securing the State Corporation Commission electronic system 
· High School Biliteracy Diploma Seal 
· Sex Offenders and Crimes Against Minors Supplement to Registry

Electoral history

References

External links
Official website

1970 births
20th-century American businesspeople
21st-century American businesspeople
Alumni of the University of Oxford
American consulting businesspeople
American political commentators
American politicians of Lebanese descent
Businesspeople from Virginia
George Mason University alumni
Georgetown University alumni
Johns Hopkins University alumni
Lebanese emigrants to the United States
Living people
Republican Party members of the Virginia House of Delegates
Politicians from Beirut
People from Loudoun County, Virginia